Pustkowie Gęzyńskie  is a settlement in the administrative district of Gmina Poraj, within Myszków County, Silesian Voivodeship, in southern Poland.

References

Villages in Myszków County